Swarga Seema is a 1945 Telugu-language drama film produced and directed by B. N. Reddy and starring V. Nagayya, B. Jayamma and Bhanumathi. Ghantasala entered film world as a Playback singer for a song of C. H. Narayana Rao and it is also Ghantasala's first duet with Bhanumathi Ramakrishna for the song Oh Naa Raaja. Marcus Bartley also made a debut as a cinematographer with this film. It is the first Telugu film to be screened at the International Film Festival, Vietnam.

Plot
Murthy (Nagayya) is a publisher happily married to Kalyani (Jayamma) and the proud father of their children. He watches a street play in his village, and notices the beautiful Subbalaxmi (Bhanumathi) in that troupe. He advises Subbalaxmi's father to take her to Madras where she would have the potential to become a big theatre artiste. He even refers them to a theatre company. They travel to Madras. Subbalaxmi is offered the lead role and changes her name to Sujatha. Murthy falls for Sujatha's charms and neglects his family. Kalyani fends for her children by taking up small tailoring works and leading a hard life. At the end, Murthy realizes his mistake and returns to his family.

Cast
Cast according to the film titles
 Nagayya as Murthi
 Jayamma as Kalyani
 Bhanumathi as Sujatha
 Narayana Rao as Narin
 Lingamurthy as Ganganna
 Siva Rao as Sreenivas
 Subba Rao, D. K. Seetapathi, Kangaswamy, Doraswamy, Nageswara Rao

Songs

Trivia
Both Ghantasala and Marcus Bartley made their debut in this film

External links
 Swargaseema at IMDb.
 Swarga Seema on indiancine.ma
 Swarga Seema on YouTube
 Swarga Seema at Idlebrain

1945 films
1940s Telugu-language films
Indian drama films
1945 drama films
Indian black-and-white films
Films directed by B. N. Reddy
Films scored by Ogirala Ramachandra Rao
Films scored by Balantrapu Rajanikanta Rao
Films scored by Nagayya